Kiakkai or Kiak Kai is an intersection and neighbourhood in Bangkok's Thanon Nakhon Chai Si Subdistrict, Dusit District. 

The term Kiakkai  is an old Thai word meaning "Provisions Department" (comparable to the current Quartermaster Department).

The neighborhood is the site of many Royal Thai Army (RTA) bases: the 1st Cavalry Regiment, King's Guard (กรมทหารม้าที่ 1 รักษาพระองค์); 1st Field Artillery Battalion, King's Guard (กรมทหารปืนใหญ่ที่ 1 รักษาพระองค์); 4th Cavalry Division King's Guard (กองพันทหารม้าที่ 4 รักษาพระองค์); and Military Armoured Vehicle Radio Station (สถานีวิทยุยานเกราะ). Often, these units have supported coups such as the Siamese revolution of 1932, the Thammasat University massacre, the 1981 April rebellion, and the September 9th rebellion. 

Kiakkai is home to the Sappaya-Sapasathan, the current Parliament House of Thailand. It is built on the site of the Yothinburana School. There is a megaproject to build a bridge across the Chao Phraya River, 5.9 km (about 3 mi) long, to Charan Sanitwong Road in Thonburi's Bang Phlat District.

References 

Neighbourhoods of Bangkok
Dusit district
Road junctions in Bangkok